Magnus Hubert Twisleton-Wykeham-Fiennes (born 21 November 1965) is an English composer, record producer and songwriter.

He has worked with artists such as Shakira, Pulp, Tom Jones and Morcheeba. In 1997 he produced the million-selling All Saints single "Never Ever", which reached number 4 on the US charts and number 1 throughout Europe; producing and co-writing on their eponymous five million selling album.

He composed and produced much of the two multi-million selling albums from the girl quartet Bond. He has composed several major film scores, numerous commercials and TV series, including many seasons of leading BBC dramas such as Hustle, Murphy's Law, and Death in Paradise. He also created developed and produced the $20 million animated cartoon series Freefonix.

Records
As a producer/arranger programmer and re-mixer, Fiennes has worked with a diverse range of artists including Neneh Cherry, Marianne Faithfull, Bryan Ferry, the Spice Girls, Hal David, Seal, Yello, Propaganda$2, Erazure, Eagle-Eye Cherry, David McAlmont, Ian McCulloch, Roland Gift, Lenny Kravitz, Nigel Kennedy, Daniel Lanois, Trilok Gurtu, Damien Hirst (in the guise of Fat Les's Vindaloo), Dot Allison, Justin Hawkins, Jamelia and Geneva.

Other work includes producing the double platinum "Watching Angels Mend" for Australian singer-songwriter Alex Lloyd, a collaboration with Canadian violinist Lara St. John on the album of "Bach with beats" for Sony Classical, co-writing material with Massive Attack and the Sugababes, and co-writing and producing album tracks and singles for Bertine Zetlitz (a Norwegian number one) and Liberty X. Although Fiennes now works primarily in the field of film and TV composition he was music director on Shakira's "The Sun Come Out 2010 World Tour".

Magnus Fiennes continues to develop and consult on US based film and TV projects including developing a TV series for Silver Television/Pictures.

Work

Film
Soup (1995)
Preaching to the Perverted (1997)
Onegin (1998)
The Reckoning (2001)
Peter Cottontail – The Movie (2005)
Casper's Scare School (2006)
Chromophobia (2007)
Donkeys (2010)

Television
Pleasureland (2003)
Hustle (2004–12)
Vital Signs (2006)
Murphy's Law (2006–07)
Five Days (2006)
The Last Enemy (2007)
Freefonix (2008–09)
The Fixer (2008–10)
Injustice (2011)
Death in Paradise (2011–present)

Film tracks
Fiennes has written and produced a number of featured songs including the title song for Paramount's Addicted to Love (featuring Neneh Cherry), Madonna's Next Best Thing and Scala Pictures music business satire, Five Seconds to Spare. Fiennes has produced tracks for Working Title's Rowan Atkinson vehicle, Johnny English, and co-wrote the closing Massive Attack song on their score for the Luc Besson film, Danny the Dog.

Live
As a keyboard player, Fiennes toured extensively with legendary blues guitarist Gary Moore in a line-up with Pink Floyd's Guy Pratt on bass and Gary Husband on drums. He was Music Director on Shakira's  "The Sun Come Out" 2010 World Tour.

Personal life
Magnus Fiennes was born in Suffolk, England in 1965, a son of photographer Mark Fiennes and novelist Jennifer Lash. He married Maya Dokic in 1995, and they have two daughters.  One of six siblings, he is brother to actors Ralph Fiennes and Joseph Fiennes, and film makers Sophie Fiennes and Martha Fiennes. Another brother, Jacob, is a conservationist. His foster brother, Michael Emery, is an archaeologist.

Notes

References

External links
Official Website

Magnus Fiennes at the British Film Institute

Magnus
English composers
Musicians from Suffolk
Living people
1965 births
English songwriters
English record producers